Sanda Wuduroma, or Abu Sanda bin Buqar al-Kanemi, (?-1894) was Shehu of Borno in 1894.

Reign
At the death of his brother and predecessor Shehu Kyari, Sanda Wuduroma (also known as Abba Sanda Limannambe) became Shehu of Borno in 1893 when the country was invaded by Rabih az-Zubayr. His reign was short-lived as he was captured and killed by one of Rabih's soldiers called Gadum in 1894. His name Wuduroma comes from the place of his assassination, Wuduro.

Dynasty

Footnotes

Bibliography
 Adeleye, Rowland, Power and Diplomacy in Northern Nigeria: 1804-1906, the Sokoto Caliphate and Its Enemies (London: Longman Group, 1971).
 Amegboh, Joseph, and Cécile Clairval, Rabah: Conquérant Des Pays Tchadiens, Grandes Figures Africaines (Paris: Dakar ; Abidjan : Nouvelles Éditions Africaines, 1976).
 Brenner, Louis, The Shehus of Kukawa: A History of the Al-Kanemi Dynasty of Bornu, Oxford Studies in African Affairs (Oxford, Clarendon Press, 1973).
 Cohen, Ronald, The Kanuri of Bornu, Case Studies in Cultural Anthropology (New York: Holt, 1967).
 Hallam, W. K. R., The Life and Times of Rabih Fadl Allah (Ilfracombe: Stockwell, 1977).
 Hallam, W. K. R., ‘Rabih: His Place in History’, Borno Museum Society Newsletter, 15-16 (1993), 5-22.
 Horowitz, Michael M., ‘Ba Karim: An Account of Rabeh’s Wars’, African Historical Studies, 3 (1970), 391-402 .
 Lange, Dierk, 'The kingdoms and peoples of Chad', in General history of Africa, ed. by Djibril Tamsir Niane, IV (London: Unesco, Heinemann, 1984), pp. 238–265.
 Last, Murray, ‘Le Califat De Sokoto Et Borno’, in Histoire Generale De l'Afrique, Rev. ed. (Paris: Presence Africaine, 1986), pp. 599–646.
 Lavers, John, "The Al- Kanimiyyin Shehus: a Working Chronology" in Berichte des Sonderforschungsbereichs, 268, Bd. 2, Frankfurt a. M. 1993: 179-186.
 Mohammed, Kyari, Borno in the Rabih Years, 1893-1901 : The Rise and Crash of a Predatory State (Maiduguri Nigeria: University of Maiduguri, 2006).

External links
 Kanuri Studies Association

Royalty of Borno
1894 deaths
19th-century rulers in Africa
Year of birth missing
19th-century Nigerian people